Long Banga Airport  is an airport serving Long Banga, Marudi District, Sarawak, Malaysia.

History
The airport was a small grass airstrip until 1965. During the Indonesia–Malaysia confrontation, the British Army established a forward base here and improved the airstrip with the aid of a small bulldozer parachuted in by the RAF.

Airlines and destinations

References

Airports in Sarawak
Marudi District